Tarzay is a village in the Gorikot Union Astore District of Gilgit-Baltistan, Pakistan.Where lives bodlay families, bodaly  is the largest family in dist astor. bodaly family lives many part of district astor. majority in gorikot union . rahman pur. sakamal . chamrot. faqir kot. astor city.

Populated places in Astore District